Secure Trust Bank is a British retail and commercial banking group listed on the London Stock Exchange, where it is a constituent of the Main Market.

History
The bank was established in 1952 as Secure Homes Limited and became a subsidiary of the Arbuthnot Banking Group in 1985.

The company became Secure Trust Bank PLC in 1994 and was floated on the London Stock Exchange in an initial public offering in November 2011.

In 2015 the bank launched an asset finance division to enable it to offer lending to businesses.

In 2016 the Arbuthnot Banking Group reduced its majority stake from 51.9% to 20%, for about £145 million.

Later that year, the bank sold its consumer lending business Everyday Loans, reducing its position in UK's unsecured personal loan market.

In January 2021, Secure Trust Bank announced that CEO Paul Lynam would be stepping down with immediate effect, to be replaced by David McCreadie, a former Managing Director at Tesco Bank.

In May of 2022, Secure Trust Bank completed the acquisition BNPL start-up AppToPay which will operate as part of V12 Retail Finance to offer a BNPL style product along side its traditional retail finance products.

Operations
The bank offers a variety of savings accounts and consumer and business lending products. Motor finance is offered via hire purchase through its Moneyway brand, and hire purchase, personal contract purchase and dealership finance through the V12 Vehicle Finance brand.

V12 Retail Finance, a company acquired by Secure Trust Bank in 2013, provides point of sale loans for a number of retailers, primarily financing consumer electronics, furniture, and leisure products.

Also in 2013, Secure Trust Bank acquired Debt Managers (Services) Limited, through which it conducts credit management and collections operations across its brands, acquired portfolios, and on behalf of private clients. In 2022, Secure Trust Bank announced it would be selling the Debt Managers business to Swedish firm Intrum.

Secure Trust Bank additionally operates in commercial finance, real estate finance, asset finance and invoice financing.

References

External links

Banks of the United Kingdom
Banks established in 1952
1952 establishments in the United Kingdom
Companies listed on the London Stock Exchange